Carter Acres is a neighborhood located in southwest Columbus, Georgia, near Fort Benning.

Columbus metropolitan area, Georgia
Neighborhoods in Columbus, Georgia